Forseth  is a surname. Notable people with the surname include:

Einar Forseth (1892–1988), Swedish artist
Gunilla Forseth (born 1985), Norwegian football striker
Paul Forseth (born 1946), Canadian politician
Ulf Forseth Indgaard (born 1989), Norwegian orienteering competitor

Norwegian-language surnames